David Berthold is an Australian theatre director and cultural leader. He has directed for many of Australia's major theatre companies, as well as in London and Berlin, and has led several key arts organisations. He was Artistic Director of Brisbane Festival, one of Australia's major international arts festivals and Queensland’s largest arts and cultural event. Through his tenure of five festivals, 2015–19,  Berthold transformed the Festival into Australia's largest major international arts festival, presenting more works to more people than any other, with an audience of more than one million people.   

Since January 2020 he has been Artistic Director in Residence at the National Institute of Dramatic Art (NIDA), an institute for education and training in the performing arts. He is a member of the NSW Government's Theatre and Musical Theatre Arts Advisory Board, on the Board of Australian Plays Transform (APT) – the national development, publication and licensing body for writing for the stage – a Trustee of the Rodney Seaborn Playwrights Award, a member of Melbourne Theatre Company’s Advisers’ Group, a member of the Helpmann Awards Theatre Panel, and Chairs the Judging Panel of the Nick Enright Prize for Playwriting (New South Wales Premier's Literary Awards).   

He was Artistic Director and Chief Executive Officer of La Boite Theatre Company (2008–14), Artistic Director and Chief Executive Officer of Griffin Theatre Company (2003–06) and Artistic Director and Chief Executive Officer of Australian Theatre for Young People (1999–2003). He was also Associate Director of Sydney Theatre Company (1994–99). Berthold has directed many premieres of plays by major Australian writers. In 2010, Berthold won a Matilda Award for his "repositioning of La Boite Theatre Company and his direction of Hamlet".

Early life and education
Berthold was born in Maitland, New South Wales . He studied at the University of Newcastle, where he took an honours degree in English literature . He spent some years training as an opera singer and won the Joan Sutherland Scholarship at the Sydney Opera House .

Productions

Sydney Theatre Company
Productions for Sydney Theatre Company playing at The Wharf and the Sydney Opera House:

Saturn's Return (Tommy Murphy). World Premiere, August 2008. Revised production transferred to larger STC theatre in July 2009.
Blackrock (Nick Enright).  World premiere. Two seasons, plus invitation to Australian Theatre Festival, Canberra.
Chasing the Dragon  (Nick Enright). World premiere.
Third World Blues (David Williamson). World premiere.
The John Wayne Principle (Tony McNamara) Two seasons, plus transfer to Playbox (Melbourne). World premiere.
The Jungle (Louis Nowra). World premiere.
Solitary Animals (Elaine Acworth). World premiere.
Darling Oscar (Vanessa Bates). World premiere.
The One Day of the Year (Alan Seymour). Plus tour.
Betrayal (Harold Pinter)
After the Ball (David Williamson).  Plus tour.
Love for Love (William Congreve)
Stiffs (Karin Mainwaring)
Poor Super Man (Brad Fraser). Australian premiere.
Simpatico (Sam Shepard). Australian premiere.
 The Price of Prayer (Louis Nowra) and In the Club (Stephen Sewell), two new short plays as part of Sydney Stories.

Griffin Theatre Company
His productions for Griffin Theatre Company include world premieres of:

Holding the Man (by Tommy Murphy from Timothy Conigrave's memoir). Six seasons, including transfers to Sydney Opera House, Company B at the Belvoir St Theatre, Brisbane Powerhouse and Melbourne Theatre Company. This production played in London's West End, at the Trafalgar Studios, from 23 April 2010 with a cast including Jane Turner.
The Emperor of Sydney (Louis Nowra)
The Peach Season (Debra Oswald)
The Marvellous Boy (Louis Nowra)
Nailed (Caleb Lewis)
Strangers in Between (Tommy Murphy). Toured nationally in 2008.
The Woman with Dog's Eyes (Louis Nowra)
Torrez (Ian Wilding).  Tour to Playbox (Melbourne), Black Swan (Perth) and regional WA.
The Secret Death of Salvador Dali (Stephen Sewell). Tour to La Boite Theatre (Brisbane).

La Boite Theatre Company

 Hamlet (Shakespeare)
 I Love You, Bro (Adam J A Cass)
 Julius Caesar (Shakespeare)
 Ruben Guthrie (Brendan Cowell)
 As You Like It (Shakespeare)
 Tender Napalm (Philip Ridley)
 Holding the Man (by Tommy Murphy from Timothy Conigrave's memoir)
 The Glass Menagerie (Tennessee Williams)
 Così  (Louis Nowra)

Australian Theatre for Young People
For ATYP his productions include:

Brokenville  (Philip Ridley) (Tour to Cottesloe Theatre, Royal National Theatre, London).
Hamlet (Shakespeare).
Sparkleshark (Philip Ridley).
Kinderspiel (co-production with Theater an der Parkaue, Berlin for the 2002 Sydney Festival at the Sydney Opera House).
Operation Marlowe (Edward the Second, adapted by Berthold, in repertory with The Massacre at Paris, in a version by Tommy Murphy).
Birds (new version by Stephen Sewell from Aristophanes, for the 2000 Olympic Arts Festival at the Sydney Opera House).
Spurboard (Nick Enright) (in association with Sydney Theatre Company, Sydney and regional tour, World Premiere).
The Dance of Jeremiah (Matthew Ryan).

Queensland Theatre Company
For QTC, he directed:

The Heidi Chronicles (Wendy Wasserstein).
Diving for Pearls (Katherine Thomson).
Jumping Stories. Queensland regional tour.
Hotel Sorrento. (Hannie Rayson).
Composing Venus (Elaine Acworth).  World premiere.

Other

Falsettos. NIDA, 2022
Mark Colvin's Kidney. Belvoir, 2017
Rolling Thunder Vietnam. Australian national tours, 2014, 2016 and 2020. 
Much Ado About Nothing (William Shakespeare). NIDA, Sydney, 2014.
Così (Louis Nowra). NIDA, Sydney, 2013.
Così fan tutte (Wolfgang Amadeus Mozart). Opera Queensland.
 Holding the Man (adapted by Tommy Murphy from Timothy Conigrave's memoir). London's West End, produced by Daniel Sparrow and Mike Walsh, 2010. 
 Edward the Second (Christopher Marlowe). QUT, Brisbane.
The Shape of Things (Neil LaBute). NIDA, Sydney.
Blackrock (Nick Enright). QUT, Brisbane.
Low (Daniel Keene).  Theater an der Parkaue, Berlin.
The Fruits of Enlightenment (Leo Tolstoy).  NIDA, Sydney
All My Sons (Arthur Miller). Auckland Theatre Company, New Zealand.
Road (Jim Cartwright). La Boite Theatre, Brisbane.
Il Barbiere di Siviglia (Gioachino Rossini).  Associate Director, Opera Queensland, Brisbane and tour.
Noye's Fludde (Benjamin Britten). Noye's Fludde Opera.
The Piper of Hamelin (John Rutter). Noye's Fludde Opera.
Romeo and Juliet (William Shakespeare). University of Newcastle Drama Department.
Cloud Nine (Caryl Churchill). University of Newcastle Drama Department.
Magic Afternoon (Wolfgang Bauer).  University of Newcastle Drama Department.
The Song Room (Louis Nowra). University of Newcastle Drama Department.
Hansel and Gretel (Engelbert Humperdinck). Assistant Director, English National Opera, London Coliseum.

References 

Australian theatre directors
People from Maitland, New South Wales
University of Newcastle (Australia) alumni
Academic staff of the University of Newcastle (Australia)
Living people
Year of birth missing (living people)